The Liechtenstein national football team is the national football team of the Principality of Liechtenstein and is controlled by the Liechtenstein Football Association. The organisation is known as the Liechtensteiner Fussballverband in German. The team's first match was an unofficial match against Malta in Seoul, a 1–1 draw in 1981. Their first official match came two years later, a 0–1 defeat from Switzerland. Liechtenstein's largest win, a 4–0 win over Luxembourg in a 2006 FIFA World Cup qualifier on 13 October 2004, was both its first ever away win and its first win in any FIFA World Cup qualifier. Conversely, Liechtenstein is the only country that lost an official match against San Marino, albeit in a friendly match. Liechtenstein suffered its biggest ever loss in 1996, during qualification for the 1998 FIFA World Cup, losing 1–11 to Macedonia, the result also being Macedonia's largest ever win to date. The team's head coach is currently Rene Pauritsch, who has taken the role as caretaker following the departure of Martin Stocklasa to FC Vaduz.

History
Liechtenstein are only a relatively recent affiliate to FIFA, and did not participate in any qualifying series until the UEFA Euro 1996 qualifiers. There they managed to surprise the Republic of Ireland by holding them to a 0–0 draw on 3 June 1995. On 14 October 1998, they managed their first victory in a qualifying campaign after winning 2–1 against Azerbaijan in a Euro 2000 qualifying match.

Since then, the presence of Liechtenstein clubs in the Swiss league system and of a handful of professional players (most notably Mario Frick) has seen the side's competitiveness improve slightly. The Euro 2004 qualifiers saw Liechtenstein improve to the extent they restricted England to 2–0 wins. Also at this time Liechtenstein lost 1-0 against San Marino, considered to be the worst national team in the world. The 2006 World Cup qualifiers, however, brought even better results as two wins over Luxembourg and draws against both Slovakia and Portugal meant that Liechtenstein finished with 8 points.

In the Euro 2008 qualifiers, Liechtenstein beat Latvia through a solitary goal from Mario Frick. The result caused the Latvian manager to resign after the match. They repeated their heroics against Iceland managing to beat them 3–0 on 17 October 2007 for their second qualifying group win. On the 26 March 2008 Liechtenstein had an embarrassing 7–1 loss to fellow small nation in Europe, Malta. This was recorded as Malta's largest win.

The Liechtensteiner Fussballverbund voted Rainer Hasler to be their "Golden Player" — their best player over the last 50 years — to mark UEFA's golden jubilee.

In the 2010 World Cup qualifiers, Liechtenstein secured a scoreless draw against Azerbaijan and a 1–1 draw against Finland, finishing bottom of Group 4 on two points.

In the Euro 2012 qualifiers, Liechtenstein were narrowly beaten 2–1 by Scotland in Hampden Park thanks to a goal by Stephen McManus in the seventh minute of additional time. They produced a shock 2–0 win at home against Lithuania; their goals were scored by Philippe Erne and Michele Polverino. In the following qualifying game, they managed a scoreless draw away to Lithuania.

In 2018, Liechtenstein entered the first ever UEFA Nations League, in group 4 of league D. Their first Nations League match saw Armenia beat them 2–1 away. Liechtenstein were able to claim their first Nations League victory, beating Gibraltar 2–0.

Recent results and forthcoming fixtures

2022

2023

Manager history

  Erich Bürzle (1990)
  Dietrich Weise (1990–1996)
  Alfred Riedl (1997–1998)
  Erich Bürzle (1998)
  Ralf Loose (1998–2003)
  Walter Hörmann (2003–2004)
  Martin Andermatt (2004–2006)
  Urs Meier (2006)
  Hans-Peter Zaugg (2006–2012)
  Rene Pauritsch (2013–2018)
  Helgi Kolviðsson (2018–2020)
  Martin Stocklasa (2020–2023)
  Rene Pauritsch (2023)

Players

Current squad
The following players were called up for the UEFA Euro 2024 qualifying matches against Portugal and Iceland on 23 and 26 March 2023 respectively.

Caps and goals are current as of 16 November 2022, after the match against Gibraltar.

Recent call-ups
The following players were called up in the last 12 months and are still eligible to represent.Notes:  = Preliminary squad
  = Injured
  = Suspended for a match

Player recordsPlayers in bold are still active and available for selection.Most capped players

Top goalscorers

Competitive record
FIFA World Cup*Draws include knockout matches decided via penalty shoot-out.UEFA European Championship*Draws include knockout matches decided via penalty shoot-out.UEFA Nations League

Head-to-head record

In literature
Prompted by the team's poor record in competitive games, British writer Charlie Connelly followed the entire qualifying campaign for the 2002 FIFA World Cup. As recorded in the subsequent book Stamping Grounds: Liechtenstein's Quest for the World Cup'', Liechtenstein lost all eight games without scoring a goal.

References

External links

Liechtensteiner Fussballverbund
RSSSF archive of most capped players and highest goalscorers
Die Elf, documentary film about Liechtenstein national team

 
European national association football teams
National team